SEPTA Regional Rail System is the commuter rail division of the Southeastern Pennsylvania Transportation Authority. It contains 153 stations on 13 lines formerly owned by both the Pennsylvania Railroad and Reading Railroad. Almost all stations are located in the Commonwealth of Pennsylvania, with the exception of four stations in the State of Delaware and two in the State of New Jersey. Various stations have closed before and during the establishment of SEPTA as well as their regional rail division.

Former stations

References

External links 
SEPTA Station Aceesssibility
Pennsylvania Railroad Station: Past and Present (Dan West)

SEPTA Regional Rail stations
Philadelphia-related lists
SEPTA Former Regional Rail